Cassia roxburghii, the red cassia, Roxburgh's cassia or Ceylon senna, is a flowering plant in the family Fabaceae.  The species is native to the Indian subcontinent and adjacent regions of Southeast Asia. It ranges throughout South India and Sri Lanka.

The Latin specific epithet roxburghii refers to the Scottish Botanist William Roxburgh.

Description
The fruit is a legume.

Gallery

References

Anthraquinone glycosides from Cassia roxburghii and evaluation of its free radical scavenging activity
Itis.org

roxburghii
Flora of India (region)
Flora of Sri Lanka
Plants used in Ayurveda
Flora of Nepal